This is a list of active and extinct volcanoes in Libya.

References

Libya
 
Volcan